James Bell (born 30 March 1866) was a Scottish footballer.

Career
Bell played club football for Dumbarton, Mauchline, Celtic, Hurlford and Kilmarnock.

Honours
Dumbarton
 Dumbartonshire Cup: Winners 1888-1889
 Greenock Charity Cup: Runners Up 1888–89
 1 representative cap for Dumbartonshire in 1889.

References

1866 births
Scottish footballers
Dumbarton F.C. players
Celtic F.C. players
Kilmarnock F.C. players
Scottish Football League players
Year of death missing
Association football goalkeepers